Spoofing, or decoying, is the practice of inundating online networks with bogus or incomplete files of the same name in an effort to reduce copyright infringement on file sharing networks. Cary Sherman, president of the Recording Industry Association of America (RIAA), calls spoofing "an appropriate response to the problem of peer-to-peer piracy," and "a self-help measure that is completely lawful."

See also

 Torrent poisoning

References

Copyright infringement
Deception